Serramezzana is a town and comune in the province of Salerno in
the Campania region of south-western Italy.

Geography
Serramezzana is located in Cilento and borders with Montecorice, Perdifumo, San Mauro Cilento and Sessa Cilento. The municipality counts two hamlets (frazioni): Caporgrassi and San Teodoro.

References

External links

Cities and towns in Campania
Localities of Cilento